"Please Don't Stop Loving Me" is a song written and recorded as a duet by American country music artists Porter Wagoner and Dolly Parton.  It was released in July 1974 as the first single from the album Porter 'n' Dolly.  "Please Don't Stop Loving Me" was Porter Wagoner and Dolly Parton's sixteenth country hit and their only number one on the country chart as a duet act. Though Parton and Wagoner had each topped the charts as solo artists, and many of their duet singles had reached the country top-ten, "Please Don't Stop Loving Me" was their only chart-topper as a duet act.  The single stayed at number one for one week and spent a total of ten weeks on the country chart.

Chart performance

References

1975 singles
Porter Wagoner songs
Dolly Parton songs
Male–female vocal duets
Songs written by Dolly Parton
Song recordings produced by Bob Ferguson (musician)
RCA Records singles
1974 songs